Glasgow International Comedy Festival is a comedy festival in Glasgow, Scotland. The comedy festival started in 2002 and is held annually in March in venues across the city. The festival is supported financially by Glasgow City Council and since 2018 has been sponsored by whisky manufacturer Whyte & Mackay. The festival is billed as the largest of its type in Europe and often has acts from all over the world perform during the festival.

In 2019 the European Commission named Glasgow as the top cultural and creative city in the United Kingdom. The report citied the Comedy Festival alongside other cultural events as being integral to this status. The festival is recognised for playing host to a number of high-profile comedians alongside providing a platform for new acts.

In 2014 the festival arranged for a comedy gig to be held on a Virgin Trains West Coast train service between London and Glasgow. Eight comedians including Patrick Monahan performed aboard a 'comedy carriage' of an afternoon service. In the same year a number of comedians used the background of the 2014 Scottish independence referendum as the focus of their material.

Comedy performances linked to charity fundraising have also been a common occurrence during the years of the festival. Most notably Kevin Bridges headlined an event to raise funds for MND Scotland in memory of campaigner Gordon Aikman raising £25,000.

The festival organisers have aimed to widen the appeal of the festival to new audiences through accessibility improvements in recent years. In 2017 the festival hosted a show delivered in British sign language, understood to be the first of its kind in the UK and in 2020 a dementia friendly comedy gig will be held in the city's west end.

References

External links
 Official site

Tourist attractions in Glasgow
Comedy festivals in Scotland
Festivals in Glasgow
Arts festivals in Scotland
Festivals established in 2002
Recurring events established in 2002
2002 establishments in Scotland